Francis Leighton (1806–1881) was an English academic and priest.

Francis Leighton may also refer to:
 Francis Leighton (British Army officer) (1696–1773), British Army general

See also
 Frances Leighton (born 1982), British water polo player